Gosnay is a commune in the Pas-de-Calais department in the Hauts-de-France region of France.

Geography
Junction 6 of the A26 autoroute is about 1/2 mile east.

Population

Places of interest
 The Commonwealth War Graves Commission cemetery.
 The church of St.Leger, dating from the 17th century.
 The remains of two Carthusian monasteries and a mill.

See also
Communes of the Pas-de-Calais department

References

External links

 The CWGC graveyard in the communal cemetery

Communes of Pas-de-Calais